Mark Daniel Walton (born October 24, 1968) is an American storyboard artist and voice actor who has worked for Walt Disney Animation Studios, DreamWorks Animation, Blue Sky Studios, Warner Animation Group, and other companies. Walton is best known for voicing Rhino the hamster in the 2008 animated film Bolt.

Early life
Mark Walton was born on October 24, 1968 in Salt Lake City, Utah, the oldest of seven children. Although he is not a professional actor, Walton said in an interview, "I liked acting in high school and college. I enjoyed it. I think at some point I decided that if I was really going to be a professional actor that it would take at least everything that I would have emotionally or physically and I knew that I really wanted to
pursue art." He graduated from Utah State University in 1998 with a degree in illustration.

Career
Mark Walton started at Walt Disney Feature Animation Florida as a story and animation intern in 1995. After performing as a show artist for The Hunchback of Notre Dame Musical Discovery Adventure North American Mall Tour in 1996, he transferred to Walt Disney Feature Animation in Burbank, CA. (now known as Walt Disney Animation Studios) in 1997 to work on his first feature, Tarzan as a storyboard artist. While at Disney, from the late 1990s and throughout the 2000s, he did storyboards for The Emperor's New Groove, The Little Matchstick Girl, Home on the Range, Chicken Little, Meet the Robinsons, and Gnomeo and Juliet, as well as storyboarding and developing the unproduced films Wild Life, My Peoples, Rapunzel and Rapunzel Unbraided, Joe Jump, and King of the Elves. Also, while at Disney, he provided the voices for Barry & Bob the Longhorns in Home on the Range (2004), Goosey Loosey for the computer-animated film Chicken Little and its video game (2005), and for Rhino the hamster in Bolt  (2008) for which he was nominated for an Annie Award for Voice Acting in a Feature Production, and the short film spin-off Super Rhino. He also storyboarded a short CGI film "The Zit" for Mike Blum's Pipsqueak Films, shown on the TV series Independent Lens. After leaving Disney in 2009, Walton storyboarded on films for DreamWorks Animation, Blue Sky Studios, Marza Animation Planet, Original Force 3D, Ken Duncan Studio, Mass Animation, On Animation, Kool Produktion AS, Rovio Animation, and Warner Animation Group. He has also taught storyboarding at California Institute of the Arts (Cal Arts), Academy of Art, SUU, and CGMA.

Numerous positive reviews came from film critics regarding Walton's performance as Rhino in Bolt. CNN noted “Walton's Rhino steals every scene he's in.”, while Enewsi stated "Walton has perfect comedic timing as Rhino". Another reviewer noted “The hamster alone is enough to make this movie worth seeing”, with other positive reviews featured in the New York Times and the Los Angeles Times, where Walton contemplated Rhino's popularity as, "he imagines he's actually something bigger and more powerful to match his big heart and big dreams -- which can't be contained by his little hamster body."

Filmography

References

External links
 
 Mark Walton, the Voice Behind the Disney Drawing Board

1968 births
Living people
American male screenwriters
American male voice actors
Blue Sky Studios people
DreamWorks Animation people
Walt Disney Animation Studios people
Skydance Media people
Illumination (company) people
American storyboard artists
Artists from Salt Lake City
Utah State University alumni
Screenwriters from Utah